Ashia Hansen,  (born 5 December 1971) is a retired British triple jumper. Fourth in the 1996 Olympic final, she broke the world indoor record when winning the 1998 European Indoor title, and went on to win gold medals at the World Indoor Championships in 1999 and 2003, at the Commonwealth Games in 1998 and 2002, and at the 2002 European Championships. Her British records of 15.15 metres (1997 outdoors) and 15.16 metres (1998 indoors), still stand.

Early life
Although born in the United States, Hansen was adopted when she was 3 months old by a Ghanaian father who worked for the United Nations and his Caucasian English wife. They moved to Ghana before settling down in London when she was eight. She was often the only black child at her East London school and later spoke of the racist sentiment and teasing she experienced. She discovered a talent for running and was introduced to athletics by a teacher. Although she competed in her first international at age 17, she remained ambivalent about turning professional and only gave up her day job seven years later to fully commit herself.

Athletics career
Hansen trained at Ilford AC then Birchfield Harriers Athletics Club in Birmingham, along with other successful British athletes such as Denise Lewis, Kelly Sotherton, Mark Lewis-Francis and Katharine Merry. She was trained by Commonwealth Games medallist Aston Moore.

At the 1998 European Indoor Championships in Valencia, Spain, Hansen won the gold medal with a world record jump of 15.16m. This record lasted for 6 years. She is also the British record holder for the outdoor event with a jump of 15.15m in 1997.

Hansen won her first major outdoor gold at the 1998 Commonwealth Games in Kuala Lumpur, Malaysia with a jump of 14.32m.

At the 1999 World Indoor Championships in Maebashi, Japan, Hansen won Gold with a world leading jump of 15.02m.

At the 2002 Commonwealth Games in Manchester, England Hansen retained her Commonwealth gold with a Games Record jump of 14.86m.

In 2002 Hansen won gold at the European Championships in Munich, Germany with a jump of 15.00m.

Hansen won her second World Indoor title at the 2003 Championships in Birmingham, UK with a jump of 15.01m.

Hansen suffered a serious knee injury during the 2004 European Cup, requiring extensive surgery. She returned to triple jumping and competed at the British Championships, where she immediately climbed back to the top of the British rankings; however, she decided not to be part of the team for the European Athletics Championships that summer.  She was hoping to make the 2008 Summer Olympics in Beijing but was unable to regain fitness in time and announced her retirement in July 2008.

Competition record

Personal life
Hansen was appointed a Member of the Order of the British Empire (MBE) in the 2003 New Year Honours for services to athletics.

Hansen has two younger sisters, one of them is her parents' biological child and the other an adopted cousin.
She has two children herself.

References

External links

Women's British Indoor Records at UK Athletics

1971 births
Living people
British female triple jumpers
British adoptees
British people of American descent
Athletes (track and field) at the 1996 Summer Olympics
Athletes (track and field) at the 2000 Summer Olympics
Olympic athletes of Great Britain
Commonwealth Games gold medallists for England
Athletes (track and field) at the 1998 Commonwealth Games
Athletes (track and field) at the 2002 Commonwealth Games
Birchfield Harriers
European Athletics Championships medalists
Members of the Order of the British Empire
Commonwealth Games medallists in athletics
World Athletics Indoor Championships winners
Medallists at the 1998 Commonwealth Games
Medallists at the 2002 Commonwealth Games